Bluff Master is a 2018 Indian Telugu-language heist thriller film directed by Gopiganesh Pattabhi starring Satya Dev and Nandita Swetha in the lead roles, while Brahmaji play supporting role. Produced by Ramesh P Pillai, it features music by Sunil Kashyap and cinematography by Dasaradhi Sivendra. It is an official remake of 2014 Tamil movie, Sathuranga Vettai. It was dubbed in Hindi as Bluff Master by Goldmines Telefilms. The film received positive responses after its digital release since the film had a limited theatrical release.

Plot
Uttam Kumar (Satyadev) is a skilled con man. He dreams of doing ingenious scams and executes them perfectly. His scams include  selling ignorant people ordinary snakes, claiming that they are exotic and will fetch crores in the international market, promoting a nonexistent multi-level marketing company with its controversial chain referral schemes promising a BMW car within a year. His scams include duping people through impersonation - posing close to/claiming  relationship with influential people, the convincing people of things such as Lilliput, exotic stones, and artifacts, last but not least the infamous Emu scam, where the investors were offered exorbitant returns through Emu farms. Avani (Nandita Swetha) is an orphan from Chinna Waltair. She comes to work for Uttam and falls for his charms. Uttam, despite having a soft corner for her, has money as his first priority. Because of this, he abandons Avani.

About 40 minutes into the film, Uttam is arrested in a minor scam but the local police didn't realise his real identity. As the newspaper publishes this scam as a small box news of low importance, ACP Chandra Sekhar IPS (Shiju) of Hyderabad Police identifies Uttam and informs the local police and multiple cases are filed against him. The police subject him to torture and try to recover the money but in vain. Uttam comes to reveal his past - He hails from a very poor family with father working as a clerk and his mother a flower selling vendor. Once, when his father heard his higher officials talking about starting a scam. He politely asks them not to do so but he is thrown and fired by them. Following a stampede, his father dies and his mother goes in a critical condition. A kind woman assures her that her son will be educated only to be seen leaving with a suitcase. When Uttam said the whole story to his mother, she suddenly dies. Overcome by grief, he decides to cheat greedy people. As the court releases him months later due to absence of solid evidence, his associates betray Uttam and escape with the remaining money. An angered investor hires Pasupathi (Aditya Menon) and his gang to recover his money and kill Uttam, gang nabs him outside the court and he is beaten to a pulp. Later he convinces them of making another con of worth a billion rupees and pay them more than their hirer. Believing his abilities they kill and dispose their hirer and pull another scam to fuel a bigger one.  He believes that if a person is foolish or greedy enough to be duped, then the person is to be blamed. He argues that every election voters are conned by the candidates who promise them the moon, but never come through.

The next scam was nothing but a trap laid for gang by Uttam, he sends the gang to a victim of one his old scams Dhana Setty (Prudhvi Raj), knowing that they'll get caught as he's alert and will call the police due to his past experience. The gang gets arrested and angered by Uttam's betrayal. Meanwhile, he moves back to Avani and she looks after him for some time, and they get married and leave for Chikmagalore. Later, she becomes pregnant. As the gang gets released they threaten Uttam to pull a bigger scam and compensate their losses and settle their lump sum of money, else he and his wife will be killed.

Uttam agrees, gang leaves Basava (Temper Vamsi) to keep an eye on pregnant Avani, and leaves to Bengaluru to perform a final heist to hand over the money to them. They target Ugrappa Gowda, a rich and politically well-connected marble and granite businessman, they target him through  - the rice pulling scam, one of the high-profile scams during the times. They offer the artifact involved in the scam as a solution to his personal, economical and political problems. As Ugrappa agrees to the deal, the artifact is transferred after rituals and the gang receives 100 Crore Rupees as payment. The passage of money results in a tussle. Uttam kills them and returns to his wife and child with the money. Finally, the look on her face makes him realize the value of life, and he leaves the money to the police custody.

Cast
 Satyadev  as Uttam Kumar
 Nandita Swetha as Avani
 Brahmaji as Guru Bhai 
 Adithya Menon as Pasupathi
 Prudhvi Raj as Dhana Shetty 
 Shiju as  ACP Chandra Sekhar
 Temper Vamsi as Basava
 Chaitanya Krishna as Nandu
 Fish Venkat as Guard

Soundtrack 

The official soundtrack of Bluff Master consisting of four songs was composed by Sunil Kashyap.

Reception 
The Times of India gave the film two-and-a-half out of five stars and wrote that "Though Bluff Master never runs out of steam, the director Gopi Ganesh Pattabhi and his screenplay stumble in striking an emotional connect to the story.". The Hindu wrote that " Satyadev's energy and the background score try to elevate the story".

References

External links 
 

2018 films
Indian heist films
Indian thriller films
2010s Telugu-language films
Telugu remakes of Tamil films
Films about con artists
2018 thriller films
2010s heist films